Alexander Nikolov (born 4 March 1940) is a boxer from  Bulgaria. He competed for Bulgaria in the 1964 Summer Olympics held in Tokyo, Japan in the light-heavyweight event where he finished in third place.

1964 Olympic results
Below is the record of Alexander Nikolov, a Bulgarian light heavyweight boxer who competed at the 1964 Tokyo Olympics:

 Round of 32: bye
 Round of 16: defeated Bernard Thebault (France) referee stopped contest
 Quarterfinal: defeated Sayed Mersal (Egypt) by decision, 5-0
 Semifinal: lost to Cosimo Pinto (Italy) referee stopped contest

References

1940 births
Olympic boxers of Bulgaria
Olympic bronze medalists for Bulgaria
Boxers at the 1964 Summer Olympics
Living people
Olympic medalists in boxing
Bulgarian male boxers
Medalists at the 1964 Summer Olympics
Light-heavyweight boxers